Miryam is a 1929 Italian silent drama film directed by Enrico Guazzoni and starring Isa Pola, Carlo Gualandri, and Aristide Garbini.

Cast
 Isa Pola as Myriam
 Aristide Garbini as Ibrahim 
 Carlo Gualandri as Mario Palmi 
 Isa Buzzanca as Ulema

References

Bibliography 
 Liliana Ellena. Film d'Africa: film italiani prima, durante e dopo l'avventura coloniale. Archivio nazionale cinematografico della Resistenza, 1999.

External links 
 

1929 films
1929 drama films
Italian drama films
Italian silent feature films
1920s Italian-language films
Films directed by Enrico Guazzoni
Italian black-and-white films
Silent drama films
1920s Italian films